The Rivista italiana di economia demografia e statistica (English: "Italian Review of Economics Demography and Statistics") is a quarterly peer-reviewed open access academic journal published by the Italian society of economics demography and statistics. It covers all aspects of economics, demography, and statistics. The journal was established in 1947 as the Rivista italiana di demografia e statistica and obtained its current name in 1950. The editor-in-chief is Chiara Gigliarano.

See also
  Italian society of economics demography and statistics

External links 
 

Economics journals
Sociology journals
Statistics journals
Publications established in 1947
1947 establishments in Italy
Quarterly journals
Multilingual journals
Academic journals published by learned and professional societies